KCNV (89.7 FM) is a listener-supported public radio station broadcasting a Classical music format. Licensed to Las Vegas, Nevada, the station is owned by Nevada Public Radio and features programming from American Public Media, National Public Radio and Public Radio International.  KCNV airs nationally syndicated shows in the evening and on weekends, including the Chicago Symphony Orchestra and the New York Philharmonic.  The NPR program From the Top, showcases young classical musicians. Pipedreams features organ music.  And Sunday Baroque, which originates from WSHU-FM in Connecticut, features music composed in and around the Baroque Era.

KCNV has an effective radiated power of 550 watts. KCNV's signal in the Las Vegas Valley is substantially weaker than that of its sister station 88.9 KNPR, which broadcasts at 22,000 watts.  KCNV's transmitter is near Potosi Mountain, off Potosi Mountain Road, amid the towers for other Las Vegas FM and TV stations in Clark County.

Translators
In addition to the main station, KCNV is relayed by these translators to widen its broadcast area. KNPR and all but one of its repeaters (all except KVNV in Reno) also simulcast KCNV on their second digital channels.

See also  
Radio Reception, Nevada Public Radio

References

External links
FCC History Cards for KCNV

CNV
Classical music radio stations in the United States
NPR member stations
CNV
Radio stations established in 1973
1973 establishments in Nevada